The women's doubles of the 1997 Skoda Czech Open tournament  played on clay in Prague, Czech Republic.

Karina Habšudová and Helena Suková were the defending champions but only Habšudová competed that year with Ruxandra Dragomir.

Dragomir and Habšudová won in the final 6–1, 5–7, 6–2 against Eva Martincová and Helena Vildová.

Seeds
Champion seeds are indicated in bold text while text in italics indicates the round in which those seeds were eliminated.

 Ruxandra Dragomir /  Karina Habšudová (champions)
 Kristie Boogert /  Alexia Dechaume-Balleret (semifinals)
 Eva Martincová /  Helena Vildová (final)
 Sonya Jeyaseelan /  Rene Simpson (semifinals)

Draw

External links
 1997 Skoda Czech Open Doubles draw

1997 - Doubles
Doubles